The Tuscola Bay wind farm, located in Fairgrove, Michigan and owned by NextEra Energy Partners, was put into operation in 2012. Each of the 75 wind turbines in the farm is 262 feet high, with a blade length of 150 feet. The output of each turbine is 1.6 megawatts, with a total farm output of 120 megawatts.

References

Wind farms in Michigan
Energy infrastructure completed in 2012
Buildings and structures in Tuscola County, Michigan
NextEra Energy